Josh Greenfeld (27 February 1928 – 11 May 2018) was an American author and screenwriter mostly known for his screenplay for the 1974 film Harry and Tonto along with Paul Mazursky, which earned them an Academy Award nomination and its star, Art Carney, the Oscar itself for Best Actor. Greenfeld also wrote Oh, God! Book II and the TV special Lovey and is the author of several books about his autistic son, Noah Greenfeld.

The trilogy, A Child Called Noah, A Place for Noah, and A Client Called Noah, details the effects that Noah's disabilities placed on the Greenfelds and the extraordinary lengths that the family went through to find the very best care available for their son. His wife, Fumiko Kometani, is a Japanese writer and has won the Akutagawa Prize, Japan's most prestigious literary award; she too wrote about their son and his developmental disability.  His older son, Karl Taro Greenfeld, a special contributor to Portfolio and Details, wrote his own story of growing up with Noah entitled Boy Alone: A Brother's Memoir.

Among Greenfeld's plays are Clandestine on the Morning Line, I Have a Dream, The Last Two Jews of Kabul, Whoosh!, and Canal Street. His novels include O for a Master of Magic, The Return of Mr. Hollywood, and What Happened Was This.

In 1968, Greenfeld signed the "Writers and Editors War Tax Protest" pledge, vowing to refuse tax payments in protest against the Vietnam War.

Greenfeld attended Brooklyn College; he received a BA from the University of Michigan and an MA from Columbia University.

References

External links
 "Noah's Story: 60 Minutes Classic"

1928 births
2018 deaths
20th-century American dramatists and playwrights
American male dramatists and playwrights
American male screenwriters
20th-century American memoirists
American tax resisters
Autism activists
Brooklyn College alumni
Jewish American dramatists and playwrights
Jewish American screenwriters
University of Michigan alumni
20th-century American male writers
American male non-fiction writers
Columbia University alumni
21st-century American Jews